If I Could Turn Back Time: Cher's Greatest Hits is the fourth U.S. compilation album by American singer-actress Cher, released on March 9, 1999, by Geffen. In January 2000, the album was certified Gold by the RIAA for selling more than 500,000 copies in the US. Billboard stated in November 2011 that the album had sold 955,000 copies in the US.

Album information 
The album was released in United States and Canada in March 1999 by Cher's former record company the Geffen records. It peaked at #57 on the US Billboard 200 album chart and #40 on the Canadian album chart. As it was made available as an import in some countries, the album peaked at #2 on the Danish albums chart in February 1999, being held from the top spot by Cher's current studio album Believe.

The album was originally released with a remix of "Don't Come Cryin' To Me," a track that was recorded during the Heart of Stone album sessions, but the track was later removed per Cher's personal request. In November of the same year, Cher's current record label Warner Brothers released the compilation The Greatest Hits outside North America, which does contain her last 1998 worldwide hit - "Believe".

Track listing

† Only available on early editions

Personnel
Cher - main vocals
Sonny Bono - main vocals
Peter Cetera - main vocals
Guy Roche - producer
Michael Bolton - producer
Bob Esty - producer
Snuff Garrett - producer
Mike Khouri - liner notes
Harry Langdon - photography
Matthew Rolston - photography

Charts

Weekly charts

Year-end charts

Certifications and sales

References

External links
Official Cher site
Interscope official site

1999 greatest hits albums
Cher compilation albums
Interscope Records compilation albums